Raathrivandi is a 1971 Indian Malayalam film, directed by Vijayanarayanan and produced by A. Raghunath. The film stars Anthikkad Mani, T. R. Omana, Jeasy and T. S. Muthaiah in the lead roles. The film had musical score by M. S. Baburaj.

Cast

T. S. Muthaiah as Peter
N. Govindankutty as Robert
Bahadoor  as Police Constable
 Kunchan 
 Veeran
Vincent as Babu
K. P. Ummer as Willy
Padmini
T. R. Omana as Lakshmiyamma
Sadhana  
Jayakumari 
 Jaraldin
 Vijayashanthi
Kayyalam
 Justin
 Sukumaran
 Jessi
 Mohan
 Nambiar
 Devassy
Kuttan Pillai
Lakshmanan
Mathew Plathottam
K. S. Parvathy 
Ramankutty Menon 
Anthikkad Mani
Abbas (Old)

Soundtrack
The music was composed by M. S. Baburaj.

References

External links
 

1971 films
1970s Malayalam-language films
Films scored by M. S. Baburaj